The IOOF Temple Building in Fairbury, Nebraska
was built during 1894–95.  It served as the Odd Fellows Hall for Fairbury for almost 70 years.  It was listed on the National Register of Historic Places in 1987.  Its architect was William Clifton and it is a Romanesque Revival architecture-styled building.

It was deemed significant architecturally as "a well-preserved commercial example of the Romanesque Revival style of architecture."  The style appeared in Nebraska during the late 1800s and early 1900s.  This building's features of the style include round-arched window openings, brick corbelling, and wall and corner pilasters and stringcourses.

References

External links

Odd Fellows buildings in Nebraska
Cultural infrastructure completed in 1894
Buildings and structures in Jefferson County, Nebraska
Romanesque Revival architecture in Nebraska
Clubhouses on the National Register of Historic Places in Nebraska
National Register of Historic Places in Jefferson County, Nebraska